Gray Matter Interactive Studios, Inc. (Gray Matter Studios; formerly Xatrix Entertainment, Inc.) was an American video game developer based in Los Angeles.

History 
Drew Markham and his business partner Barry Dempsey founded Xatrix Entertainment in March 1993. The studio's first release was Cyberia in 1994. Among its later projects was Quake II Mission Pack: The Reckoning, for which it worked with publisher Activision. Around 1999, some of the original business partners sought to exit the company. To handle this efficiently, Xatrix was transferred to a new corporation under Markham as creative director. With the assistance of Activision, Gray Matter Studios was established on June 17, 1999, and took over most of the former employees. Activision initially owned 40% of the studio. It bought the remaining 60% in January 2002, after the successful release of Return to Castle Wolfenstein. Post-acquisition, the studio was put to work on the Call of Duty: United Offensive expansion. It also worked on Trinity: The Shatter Effect, which was announced and then canceled in late 2003. In 2005, during the development of Call of Duty 2: Big Red One, Gray Matter Studios was merged into Activision's Treyarch studio. As part of Treyarch, the former Gray Matter Studios team worked on Call of Duty 3.

Games developed

As Xatrix Entertainment

As Gray Matter Studios

Canceled 
 Trinity: The Shatter Effect

References 

1993 establishments in California
2005 disestablishments in California
Defunct Activision subsidiaries
Defunct companies based in Greater Los Angeles
Defunct video game companies of the United States
Video game companies disestablished in 2005
Video game companies established in 1993
Video game development companies